Janta Ka Reporter is a news website in India founded by former BBC, Newslaundery and Aaj Tak journalist, Rifat Jawaid in 2015. 

The publication has gotten popular criticism for its claims on the validity of its own reader polls and misreporting.

In 2016, All India Majlis-e-Ittehadul Muslimeen President,  Asaduddin Owaisi threatened to sue the publication for inciting communalism before the elections in Bihar.

References

Further consideration

External links
 

Asian news websites
English-language newspapers published in India